Men of Industry (Danish: Industriens Mænd) is a 1893–1904 oil on canvas group portrait painting by Peder Severin Krøyer (1851–1909) featuring 53 leading representatives of the technical sciences in Denmark during the second half of the 19th century, seen at a fictional gathering at Østerbro Power Station in Copenhagen. The painting was commission by Gustav Adolph Hagemann and is now on display in the Museum of National History at Frederiksborg Castle, Hillerød.

History
The idea for the painting was conceived by Hagemann in 1881 while he was entertaining C. F. Tietgen who was posing for Peder Severin Krøyers portrait of him. Hagemann presented the idea of four monumental group portrait paintings for the newly refurbished Great Hall in Børsen featuring leading representatives of the trade, industry agriculture and shipping sectors in Denmark.

Only the first of the four paintings, From Copenhagen Stock Exchange (1895), was realized. The idea for Men of Industry was revived in 1902 but now as a private commission by Hagemann, paid for out of his own pocket, for his home in Bredgade. Hagemann, who was a co-owner of Øresunds Chemiske Fabrikker, a board member and major shareholder of  Burmeister & Wain and had just been appointed as director of the College of Advanced Technology, was at the height of his career.

The price agreed upon for the painting was DKK 10,000. By February 1903, Hagemann had created a list of the people who were to feature in the painting. The choice of people was not representative but rather a reflection of Hagemann's own network. Work on the painting was interrupted when Krøyer fell ill in the summer of 1903. It was completed in December 1904. It was first shown to the public in the spring of 1905.

Hagemann died in 1916. Sometime during the 1930s the painting was placed in G.A. Hagemann's Kollegium on Kristianiagade in Copenhagen. In 1958, it was purchased for DKK 20,000 by the Museum of National History at Frederiksborg Castle.

List of people portrayed in the painting

Other versions
Kræyer created a pen study, two pastels on cartoon and a small oil on canvas study before embarking ion the final painting. The pen study was already lost before the painting had been completed. One of the pastels belong to the Danish Association of Engineers. The other one was in August 1995 sold by Bruun Rasmussen to the utility company NESA. It was after the merger with DONG Energy placed in the Energy Museum in Viborg on loan. The oil study is privately owned.

Further reading
 Eller, Povl: Industriens mænd - et maleri af P. S. Krøyer 1903,Fr. G.Knudtzons Bogtrykkeri (1985)
 Birgitte Wistoft and Henry Nielsen: Industriens Mænd - et Krøyer-maleris tilblivelse og industrihistoriske betydning. Forlaget Klim (1996)

References 

Paintings by Peder Severin Krøyer
Group portraits by Danish artists
Cultural depictions of Danish men
Paintings in Capital Region of Denmark
1904 paintings
Industrial history of Denmark